Alpha Delta Alpha was an American fraternity, established in 1920.

History
It became a national fraternity shortly thereafter in a merger with a similar society at the University of Iowa.

By  it had shifted focus to become a general social fraternity, adding within a few years chapters at six additional regional institutions in Iowa and Indiana.

A merger was discussed with Beta Phi Theta in the early 's, but was not consummated. 

Baird's notes no single national successor group, however several chapters continued as locals, sooner or later joining other national fraternities.

's Gamma chapter at Northern Iowa was present for nine years after the national was disbanded, operating as a local fraternity according to that institution's yearbooks. Due to WWII enlistment, by  all fraternity activity on the campus appears to have ceased; no fraternities are shown in the 1944 yearbook; the sororities at Northern Iowa continued in operation.  On that campus, other fraternities resumed in 1946 but these did not include Alpha Delta Alpha.

Some of its members went on to join a new chapter of Theta Tau on that campus.

Symbols
The badge of Alpha Delta Alpha was an equilateral triangle, one point down, having a border of 21 pearls.

The fraternity's colors were red, white and purple.

Chapters
The Baird's Manual Archive notes the formation of eight chapters by 1932. Active chapters at the time of dissolution in  listed in bold, inactive chapters listed in italics.

Notes

References 

Fraternities and sororities in the United States
Student organizations established in 1920
1920 establishments in Iowa
Defunct fraternities and sororities